Elachista albisquamella is a moth in the family Elachistidae. It was described by Zeller in 1877. It is found in Colombia.

References

Moths described in 1877
albisquamella
Moths of South America